Illawatura is a small village located in Gampola, Central Province, Sri Lanka. It lies about 6 kilometers (4 miles) east of the main city of Gampola, around 20 km (12 miles) south of the capital of Central Province, Kandy, and approximately 85 km (53 miles) west of the commercial capital of Sri Lanka, Colombo.

The population of Illawatura mainly consists of Muslims, with small groups of Hindus and Christians. The Mahaweli River flows through Illawatura.

The Illawatura Rahmaniya Muslim Vidyalaya Schule, the only school in Illawatura, teaches about 100 students. Illawatura lies approximately 750 meters from Zahira College, Gampola.

See also
List of towns in Central Province, Sri Lanka

References

External links

Populated places in Kandy District